Federal Ministry of Youth and Sport Development  is responsible for youths and Sports affairs with the vision "to empower Nigerian youths to becoming self-reliant and socially responsible."  The Ministry is the outcome of the merger of the defunct Federal Ministry of Youth Development (FMYD) and the National Sports Commission (NSC) by the proclamation of His Excellency, Mr. President Muhammadu Buhari on the restructuring of Ministries, Departments and Agencies (MDAs) of Government on 11 November 2016. This departments focusing on enterprise development, vocational skills & training, youth voice, employment, and education. The ministry is responsible for the national youth policy, youth development programmes, funding youth activities, youth participation, and to manage the National Youth Services Corps and the Citizenship and Leadership Training Centre. The current minister of Youths and Sports Development, Mr. Sunday Dare, was sworn in by President Muhammadu Buhari to head this ministry on August 21, 2019. He took over from Mr. Solomon Dalung, who served in the president's first tenure in office.Nigeria Ministry of Sport

The Mandate
The mandate of the Federal Ministry of Youth and Sport Development is "Formulation, Implementation, Monitoring and Evaluation of Policies and Programmes on Youths and Sports Development towards Wealth Creation, Youth Empowerment, Physical Fitness and Well-being, Achieving Excellence in Sports, National Unity and Sustainable Development".

National Sports Commission
National Sports Commission is the Nigerian apex body responsible for regulating sports in the country, with Alhassan Yakmut serving as the last Director-General before it was scrapped by the Muhammadu Buhari government in 2015. It is headed by the Minister of Sports in Nigeria. Its origin dates as far back as 1910 with the creation of empire Day competition.

Name Changes
National Sports Council (1962–1963)
Ministry of Labour (1964–1971)
National Sports Commission (1971–1975)
Ministry of Social Development, Youth and Sports (1975–1979)
Ministry of Youth and Culture (1979–1982)
Ministry of Youth, Sport and Culture (1982–1990)
Ministry of Youth and Sports (1990–1992)
National Sports Commission (1992–1995)
Ministry of Youth and Sports (1995–1999)
Ministry of Sports and Social Development (1999–2007)
National Sports Commission (2007–2015)

Some Notable Moments
Nigeria participated in an international sporting event for the first time at 1934 Common Wealth and Empire Day Games held in London.
Nigeria first contingent participation in 1950 Commonwealth Games, 1952 Olympics in Finland and 1965 All African Games in Brazzaville, Congo
National Sports Council was established in 1962, as a parastatal under the Federal Ministry of Labour
Became established as the National Sports Commission in 1971 (by the Federal Military Government Decree 34 of 1971)
In 1975, Nigeria had her first Minister for Youth and Sports
In 1995, The National Sport Commission was nulled and replaced with Ministry of Youth and Sports.
In 2007, The Ministry for Sport and Social again nulled then replaced with the National Sports Commission.

See also
Youth in Nigeria
Young Startup in Nigeria
Sports in Nigeria
Nigerian Football Association
Nigerian Basketball Association

References

 
Public administration
Government of Nigeria
Sport in Nigeria